Gold Harbour is a small bay  south-southwest of Cape Charlotte, with Bertrab Glacier at its head, along the east end of South Georgia. During the early 1900s, the feature was variously called "Anna's Bay", "Gold-Hafen" or "Sandwich Bay"; the latter name has also been used for Iris Bay. The approved name appears to have taken root through common usage by sealers and whalers and is now well established.

Gold Harbour is so called because the sun's rays make the cliffs yellow with their light in the morning and evening. There is no particular historical or geological reason to give Gold Harbour its mineral name, which was in common use among the early sealers. Perhaps they were inspired by the sunsets.

Wildlife
The area is a breeding ground for penguins, including King penguins and Gentoo penguins; Southern elephant seals also breed here, especially at the west end of the beach, where a glacial stream flows. Light-mantled albatrosses breed here as well.

See also
Bjornstadt Bay
Gold Head

References

 Child, Jack. Antarctica and South American Geopolitics: Frozen Lebensraum. New York: Praeger Publishers, 1988, 13–14, 27–28.
 Lonely Planet, Antarctica: a Lonely Planet Travel Survival Kit, Oakland, CA: Lonely Planet Publications, 1996, pp. 275–281.
 U.S. National Science Foundation, Geographic Names of the Antarctic, Fred G. Alberts, ed. Washington: NSF, 1980.

External links
 Video of Gold Harbour
 Picture of Gold Harbour

Ports and harbours of South Georgia